"Murder on the Planet Express" is the twenty-fourth episode of the seventh season of the animated sitcom Futurama. It originally aired on Comedy Central on August 21, 2013. The episode was written by Lewis Morton and directed by Frank Marino. In this episode, the crew get trapped aboard the Planet Express ship with a horrific alien creature. The episode's title derives from Murder on the Orient Express and parodies Alien and The Thing.

Plot
Fry accuses Bender of using his toothbrush to polish his buttocks, and purchases a spy camera to check. At the Planet Express offices, Hermes accuses Zoidberg of eating his lunch. Leela accuses Amy of using her punching bag for golf ball practice. In turn, Amy accuses Leela of using her golf club to pound dents out of the Planet Express ship. The crew gathers together later that day, and Fry publicly accuses Bender. He shows the others the video he recorded, but it turns out that although Bender was not using his toothbrush that night, he did steal Fry's kidney whilst he slept. Leela  reveals she also used a spy cam to spy on Amy, only to find out that Scruffy had used Amy's club to kill a fly and that Zoidberg had been living in Leela's punching bag. Hermes also used a spy camera to catch Zoidberg eating his lunch, only to find out that Bender had used his lunchbox to keep Fry's kidney on ice. Much to everyone's disgust, the footage shows Leela unwittingly eating the kidney, and that Hermes' manwich had instead been used in Professor Farnsworth's kidney transplant. The crew continue to bicker uncontrollably until Farnsworth threatens to do something about it.

Farnsworth hires business consultant Dan McMasters for a team building exercise. On the way to the corporate team building retreat, they pick up a random hitchhiker at the behest of McMasters. The hitchhiker is used by McMasters to be the first "trust fall", but McMasters is apparently eaten by the hitchhiker, who transforms into a monster, crawls into the ventilation shafts and shuts off the power. Scruffy's apprentice Jackie Jr. is soon eaten by the creature. The crew go to the panic room, but the creature shuts off the life support for the ship. Farnsworth splits the crew into three teams: Zoidberg and Hermes must restart the life support system, Leela and Amy must travel to the bridge to get the steering wheel so as to pilot the ship from the panic room, and Bender and Fry must relight the pilot light from outside the ship to get the engines restarted. Fry and Bender manage to restart the engines, but Bender's gyroscope is broken when the engines ignite in his face. Zoidberg and Hermes restart the life support system (which was being blocked by a skeleton they assume is Jackie Jr.'s), but Hermes' motion detector shows that the monster is coming. Hermes gets stuck in the vent and Zoidberg tries, in vain, to free him.

Amy and Leela are in the basement of the ship and encounter the monster. Leela attempts to fight it, but is captured. Amy's golf shot to the monster's face saves her and they make a run for the bridge. Outside the ship, Bender's gyroscope is still not working; panicked, he accidentally breaks Fry's helmet causing him to suffocate in the vacuum of space. Bender, in a bid to save his life as well as fix his gyroscope, stuffs Fry into his compartment. Fry then takes over Bender's body by wearing him like a suit (creating a combination dubbed "Frender") and gets him under control. Leela and Amy finally make it to the bridge and take the steering wheel. Happy with their success, they proclaim themselves "Lamy". They run back to the panic room and see what they think is the monster (but is actually Hermes stuck in the vent) and attack it. Zoidberg, calling themselves "Hermberg", dislodges Hermes by squirting him with ink. Amy fixes Bender's gyroscope by bashing him with her club, but the group abruptly comes face to face with the monster and flee back to the panic room.

Once they get the ship up and running again, Professor Farnsworth reveals that the whole thing was an exercise in trust. The three teams congratulate each other, but Hermes is abruptly eaten by the monster, who was disguised as the Professor, who also manages to claim Scruffy and the Professor himself via shape-shifting. The surviving crew members run out of the panic room and arm themselves with laser pistols. The monster continues to eat various members of the crew until only Fry and Bender are left; they meet up and proclaim that they trust each other (and Bender admits to using Fry's toothbrush) before McMasters enters the room. McMasters assures them that the whole thing was staged to help build trust and the monster, Blorgulax, is his business associate. He asks them to join him and the rest of the crew to a pizza party on the bridge, but Fry and Bender are convinced that he is the monster and kill him. Too late, the crew reveal themselves to be alive and well, and Bender disposes of what little is left of McMasters. Back on Earth, a news report is talking about the mysterious disappearance of McMasters and are calling it a homicide. Fry and Bender agree to not tell anyone about what happened. Linda then states that the police will give $1,000,000 for information leading to an arrest. In the event of two killers, they will give total immunity to whoever turned in the other and $2,000,000 (a variant of the prisoner's dilemma). Bender and Fry then glare at each other and at the phone on the table.

Reception
Zack Handlen of The A.V. Club gave this episode a B+. Max Nicholson of IGN gave the episode an 8.8/10 "Great" rating, saying the episode "featured consistent laughs and one of the best storylines in recent memory."

Lewis Morton was nominated for a Writers Guild of America Award for Outstanding Writing in Animation at the 66th Writers Guild of America Awards for his script to this episode.

References

External links
 
 

2013 American television episodes
Futurama (season 7) episodes